The 1986 BCE International Open was a professional ranking snooker tournament that took place from September to October 1986 at Trentham Gardens in Stoke-on-Trent, England.

Neal Foulds won his only ranking title by defeating Cliff Thorburn 12–9 in the final. Foulds defeated his father, Geoff, 5–0 in 70 minutes in their last-32 match. This is the only time a father and son have faced each other in a ranking event. Additionally, Peter Francisco beat his uncle Silvinho in the quarter finals.



Main draw

References

Scottish Open (snooker)
International Open
International Open
International Open
International Open
Sport in Stoke-on-Trent